Stephen William Elliott (born 6 January 1984) is an Irish retired professional footballer who played as a striker. He played for Manchester City, Sunderland, Wolves, Preston North End, Heart of Midlothian, Coventry City Carlisle United, Shelbourne, Drogheda United and Morpeth Town, and had a loan spell at Norwich City.

He played in nine international matches for the Republic of Ireland between 2004 and 2006, scoring once.

Club career
Elliott began his career as a youth player with Belvedere. and Stella Maris.

Manchester City
Elliott began his professional career as a youth player at Manchester City after impressing in a trial match with Stella Maris in which he scored five goals in the space of half an hour. His league debut came on 21 February 2004 when Kevin Keegan used him as a late substitute in a 3–1 win at Bolton Wanderers. He failed to establish himself in the first team, making only one further appearances as a substitute, with his development at City hampered by a serious back injury that ruled him out for a season.

Sunderland
Sunderland manager Mick McCarthy signed him from Manchester City on 1 June 2004 for an initial fee of £125,000, set by a tribunal, with well over £250,000 of additional payments linked to his subsequent performance at the Black Cats of around £100,000 if Sunderland were promoted to the Premier League; £50,000 if he played in a competitive game for the Republic of Ireland; five instalments of £20,000 for each set of ten appearances he made for Sunderland up to a maximum of 50 games; and 25% of any sell-on transfer fees. McCarthy later admitted that he had bought him outrageously cheaply, although that was before all of the above add-ons were ultimately realised.
He made his debut on 7 August against Coventry in their 2–0 defeat, with his first goal for the club coming on 10 August against Crewe Alexandra, scoring the winner in their 3–1 win.
He quickly established himself as first-team regular, making 47 appearances scoring 16 goals in his debut season as the team finished as champions in 2005, helping him win the clubs young player of the season award. And in July 2005 he signed a contract extension extending his stay until 2008.

However, his first Premiership season was largely disrupted by injury, only managing 15 appearances although prior to his injuries he scored two long-range goals against Manchester United and Newcastle United.

On Sunderland's return to the Championship the following season, he showed good form when fit, but again was disrupted by an ankle injury which kept him out for two months. In all he made 88 appearances for Sunderland scoring 23 goals.

Wolverhampton Wanderers
Elliott moved to Wolves in July 2007 for an undisclosed fee signing a three-year contract, linking up with Mick McCarthy, his former manager at Sunderland. He made his debut on 11 August 2007 in their 2–1 defeat to Watford, going on to score his first goal for the club on 15 September scoring the opening goal against Sheffield United. However, he failed to make a strong impact at Molineux, and was transfer-listed at the season's end after the club missed out on the play-offs on goal difference.

He made one more appearance for Wolves the following season in the League Cup against Rotherham. In all he made 32 appearances for Wolves scoring five times.

Preston North End
On 1 September 2008, Elliot signed for Championship side Preston North End on a three-year deal for an undisclosed fee. He made his debut as a substitute on 16 September against Nottingham Forest, and scored his first goal for the club on 18 October 2008 against Reading, with the winning goal in their 2–1 win. He scored a brace against his former team Wolves at Molineux in their 3–1 win in January. He was to form a partnership with Jon Parkin in Preston's attack. In his debut season he made 39 appearances scoring six times.

The following season he made 13 appearances scoring twice before falling out of favour and in March 2010 he joined Norwich on loan. On his return on 7 August he negotiated an early release from his Preston contract.

Norwich City
On 6 March 2010, Elliot signed on an emergency loan deal with Norwich City until the end of the season and was given the number 11 shirt. He made his debut on 6 March 2010 against Yeovil in League One, scoring his first goals for the club the following week, scoring a brace against Huddersfield in their 3–1 win. In all he made ten appearances scoring twice.

Heart of Midlothian
On 9 August 2010 Elliott joined Scottish Premier League side Heart of Midlothian on a two-year deal, reuniting him with former strike partner at Sunderland Kevin Kyle. He made his debut as a 66th-minute substitute on 14 August against St Johnstone at Tynecastle, going on to make his first start on 7 November against rivals Hibernian in the first Edinburgh Derby of the season scoring the second goal in a 2–0 victory for Hearts. He scored his first home goal for the club on 10 December to make the score 3–0 in a 5–0 victory against Aberdeen. Despite a hamstring injury that put him out for a month, he made 31 appearances scoring eight goals in his debut season.

Elliott become renowned for his crucial goals away from home. Of his eight goals for Hearts in his debut season, seven came away from home including doubles at Hamilton in a 2–0 win, and at Kilmarnock in a 2–1 victory, the latter coming after Elliott had come off the substitutes bench for the second half to reverse a 1–0 deficit. Elliott scored an equalising goal in the 83rd minute of the third Edinburgh derby of the season, earning Hearts a 2–2 draw despite having played for over an hour with ten men.

He made his European debut on 28 July 2011 in a Europa League qualifier against Paksi. Elliott helped Hearts win the 2011–12 Scottish Cup; he started in the 2012 Scottish Cup Final, which Hearts won 5–1 against Hibernian. Days later, Hearts announced that Elliott's contract would not be renewed.

Coventry City
On 2 July 2012, Elliott joined Football League One side Coventry City on a one-year deal after his Heart of Midlothian contract had expired. He scored three goals up to the new year, against Sheffield United and scored two against MK Dons at Stadium MK which Coventry won 3–2 after going behind. Coventry manager Steven Pressley announced on 30 April 2013 that Elliott's contract would not be renewed.

Carlisle United
On 7 August 2014, Elliott signed a one-year deal with recently relegated Football League Two side Carlisle United.

Return to Ireland
In April 2016, Elliott trained with League of Ireland Premier Division club Shamrock Rovers before signing for Dublin First Division side Shelbourne.
On 11 August 2016, Shelbourne announced Stephen had left by mutual consent. Elliott signed for newly promoted Premier Division side Drogheda United for the 2017 season but his two goals in 19 league games could not help them from finishing bottom on the league and being relegated.

Morpeth Town 
Elliott signed for Northern League Division One outfit Morpeth Town in November 2017. He retired at the end of the season.

International career
Elliott has represented Ireland at U-17 level, U-19, the U-20 team at the 2003 FIFA World Youth Championship, where he was their top goalscorer, and the U-21 team where he made 10 appearances scoring five times.

Elliott's good start for Sunderland in 2004 led to a call-up to the Republic of Ireland senior squad, and he made his international debut against Croatia at Lansdowne Road on 16 November 2004. He scored his first senior International goal to beat Cyprus 1–0 in a World Cup qualifier on 8 October 2005. In all he made nine appearances for Ireland at full international level.

Personal life
Elliott was born in Dublin in the Republic of Ireland. He is often known by the nickname of Sleeves, which he picked up whilst playing for Sunderland from a phrase he said "Sleeves Up".

Career statistics

Honours
Sunderland
Football League Championship): 2004–05, 2006–07

Norwich City
Football League One: 2009–10

Heart of Midlothian
Scottish Cup: 2011–12

Individual
FAI Young International Player of the Year: 2005

References

External links

Ireland stats at 11v11

1984 births
Living people
Republic of Ireland association footballers
Association footballers from Dublin (city)
Association football forwards
Republic of Ireland international footballers
Republic of Ireland youth international footballers
Republic of Ireland under-21 international footballers
Premier League players
English Football League players
Scottish Premier League players
League of Ireland players
Belvedere F.C. players
Stella Maris F.C. players
Manchester City F.C. players
Sunderland A.F.C. players
Wolverhampton Wanderers F.C. players
Preston North End F.C. players
Norwich City F.C. players
Heart of Midlothian F.C. players
Coventry City F.C. players
Carlisle United F.C. players
Shelbourne F.C. players
Drogheda United F.C. players
Morpeth Town A.F.C. players
Expatriate footballers in England
Expatriate footballers in Scotland